Ice hockey in the Philippines is a minor but emerging sport.

History
The history of ice hockey in the Philippines began with the ice rinks set up in shopping malls in the country which were initially only used for recreational activities. The film Mighty Ducks released in the 1990s helped promote the winter sport in the country, with most members of the 2017 national team citing the film as their inspiration in taking up the sport.

The governing body of ice hockey in the country, the Federation of Ice Hockey League (FIHL), was formed years later in February 2015. The FIHL was admitted as an associate member of the International Ice Hockey Federation (IIHF) on 20 May 2016 and secured Philippine Olympic Committee membership by July 2016.

A IIHF sanctioned league, the Philippine Hockey League was organized in 2018 fulfilling a prerequisite for the Philippine men's national team participation in the Ice Hockey World Championships.

National and international competitions

Prior to 2008 and before the formation of the FIHL, club selection teams competed in regional competitions as unofficial national teams.

After the formation of the FIHL, national ice hockey teams were officially organized. The men's national team made their official debut at the 2017 Asian Winter Games while the women's team made theirs at the 2017 IIHF Women's Challenge Cup of Asia.

The main league in the country is the Philippine Hockey League which follows IIHF regulations. A recreational ice hockey league, the Manila Ice Hockey League, is also held.

Participation rates

Since the Philippines is a tropical country with no winter season, ice hockey and some other winter sports are played on artificial ice rinks. In 2016, there were 211 registered players from five clubs in the country. Despite increasing popularity, the expenses involved in playing the sport hinder its adoption rate.

The FIHL plans to introduce the ice hockey in schools through field hockey, a similar sport.

Ice rinks
As of 2016, there are four ice rinks in the country, all part of shopping malls:

SM Mall of Asia Ice Skating Rink - Pasay
SM Megamall Ice Skating Rink - Mandaluyong
SM Southmall Ice Skating Rink - Las Piñas
SM Seaside City Cebu Ice Skating Rink - Cebu City

Tournaments hosted
The following are IIHF-sanctioned ice hockey tournaments hosted in the Philippines.
2018 IIHF Challenge Cup of Asia
2019 Southeast Asian Games – ice hockey tournament

References

 
Sports in the Philippines
Philippines